Hariamanto Kartono (born 1954) is a retired male Chinese Indonesian badminton player.

Career

Partnered first with Rudy Heryanto and later with singles star Liem Swie King, Kartono was one of the world's leading doubles players in the early and mid-1980s. As upstarts, he and Heryanto took silver medals at the 1980 IBF World Championships in Jakarta, losing the final to veteran fellow countrymen Ade Chandra and Christian Hadinata. At the 1981 All-England Championships they avenged that loss in the semifinal, and went on to defeat another highly decorated Indonesian pair, Tjun Tjun and Johan Wahjudi, in the final. They won the All-Englands again in 1984  and the Indonesia Open in 1982 and 1983. Partnered with Liem Swie King, Kartono won the Indonesia Open again in 1985 and 1986, and the Badminton World Cup in 1984 and 1985. Kartono and King earned bronze medals together at the 1985 IBF World Championships in Calgary, losing a close semifinal to the eventual champions Park Joo-bong and Kim Moon-soo.

Kartono tasted both the bitter and the sweet in contests for badminton's highly coveted Thomas Cup (men's world team championship). In 1982 he and Heryanto, after beating one Chinese team, lost the match that gave China its first Thomas Cup title. In the following 1984 Thomas Cup series, however, he teamed with Liem Swie King to take the crucial rubber match from China in a three matches to two Indonesian victory.

Achievements

World Championships 
Men's doubles

World Cup 
Men's doubles

World Games 
Men's doubles

World Masters Games 

Men's doubles

Southeast Asian Games 
Men's doubles

International Tournaments 

The World Badminton Grand Prix has been sanctioned by the International Badminton Federation from 1983 to 2006.

Men's doubles

Mixed doubles

 IBF Grand Prix tournament
 IBF Grand Prix Finals tournament

References

External links
 

1954 births
Living people
Indonesian male badminton players
Indonesian people of Chinese descent
World Games medalists in badminton
World Games bronze medalists
Competitors at the 1981 World Games
Asian Games medalists in badminton
Asian Games gold medalists for Indonesia
Asian Games silver medalists for Indonesia
Badminton players at the 1978 Asian Games
Badminton players at the 1982 Asian Games
Medalists at the 1978 Asian Games
Medalists at the 1982 Asian Games
Southeast Asian Games gold medalists for Indonesia
Southeast Asian Games medalists in badminton
Competitors at the 1985 Southeast Asian Games
People from Tegal
Sportspeople from Central Java